Torfinnsvatnet is a lake in the municipality of Voss in Vestland county, Norway. The lake has a dam on the west side, which keeps the water level regulated for the local hydroelectric power plants. The river Torfinno connects the lake to the nearby lake Hamlagrøvatnet.

See also
List of lakes in Norway

References

Voss
Lakes of Vestland
Reservoirs in Norway